William Howard Baynard (February 28, 1892 – June 1971) was an American Negro league outfielder in the 1910s and 1920s.

A native of James Island, South Carolina, Baynard attended Morris Brown College. He made his Negro leagues debut in 1914 for the Philadelphia Giants, and went on to play for several teams, finishing his career in 1927 with the Lincoln Giants. Baynard died in Camden, South Carolina in 1971 at age 79.

References

External links
 and Baseball-Reference Black Baseball stats and Seamheads

1892 births
1971 deaths
Bacharach Giants players
Brooklyn Royal Giants players
Cuban Giants players
Hilldale Club players
Lincoln Giants players
Lincoln Stars (baseball) players
Pennsylvania Red Caps of New York players
Philadelphia Giants players
Baseball outfielders
Baseball players from South Carolina
People from Charleston County, South Carolina
20th-century African-American sportspeople